Tannheim is a municipality in the district of Reutte in the Austrian state of Tyrol.

Geography
Tannheim is the principal town of the Tannheim valley, through which the Vils flows.

References

Cities and towns in Reutte District